Strayer-Couchman House, also known as the Couchman House or Susan Couchman House, is a historic home located near Martinsburg, Berkeley County, West Virginia. It was built about 1850, and is a two-story, "L"-shaped, clapboard sided log house in the Greek Revival style.  It has a gable roof and a one-story, one bay, period entrance porch with a flat roof. The oldest section of the rear ell was built about 1810 and connected to the main house between 1860 and 1880.

It was listed on the National Register of Historic Places in 1994.

References

Houses on the National Register of Historic Places in West Virginia
Greek Revival houses in West Virginia
Houses completed in 1850
Houses in Berkeley County, West Virginia
National Register of Historic Places in Berkeley County, West Virginia